The 2007 Sultan of Selangor Cup was played on 11 August 2007, at Shah Alam Stadium in Shah Alam, Selangor. It was held in conjunction with Malaysia's 50th independence.

Match 
Source:

Players 

Source:

Veterans 
A match between veterans of two teams are also held in the same day before the real match starts as a curtain raiser.

References 

2007 in Malaysian football
Selangor FA
Sultan of Selangor Cup